Spirit Lake is a lake in Skamania County, Washington, United States, located north of Mount St. Helens. It was a popular tourist destination for many years until Mount St. Helens erupted in 1980. Previously there had been six camps on the shore of Spirit Lake: Boy Scout (Camp Spirit Lake), the Girl Scout Camp at Spirit Lake, two YMCA camps (Camp Loowit, and Portland YMCA camp), Harmony Fall Lodge, and another for the general public. There were also several lodges accessible to visitors, including Spirit Lake Lodge and Mt. St. Helens Lodge. The latter was owned and operated by Harry R. Truman, a noted victim of the volcano's 1980 eruption.

Pre-1980 eruption 
Prior to 1980, Spirit Lake consisted of two arms that occupied what had been the valleys of the North Fork Toutle River and a tributary. About 4,000 years ago, these valleys were blocked by lahars and pyroclastic flow deposits from Mount St. Helens to form the pre-1980 Spirit Lake. A stable outlet channel flowed from the lake to the North Fork Toutle River across a natural dam composed of volcanic material.

Climate
Pre-eruption weather data from the Spirit Lake Ranger Station indicates the area either had the rare dry-summer variant of the subarctic climate (Köppen climate classification: Dsc), or the rare cold-summer mediterranean climate (Köppen climate classification: Csc), both of which are found only in small areas across the world. Recent climate data for the area is not available to confirm whether the post-eruption site still has either one of these rare climate types.

Mount St. Helens eruption 
During the 1980 eruption of Mount St. Helens, Spirit Lake received the full impact of the lateral blast from the volcano. The eruption tore thousands of trees from the surrounding hillsides and swept them into Spirit Lake. These thousands of shattered trees formed a floating log raft on the lake surface that covered about 40% of the lake's surface after the eruption.

After the eruption, Spirit Lake contained highly toxic water with volcanic gases seeping up from the lake bed. A month after the eruption, the bacteria-carrying water was devoid of oxygen. Scientists predicted that the lake would not recover quickly, but the reemergence of phytoplankton starting in 1983 began to restore oxygen levels. Amphibians such as frogs and salamanders recolonized the lake, and fish (reintroduced by fishermen) thrived.

Current water level 

The  tunnel was cut through Harrys Ridge to South Coldwater Creek, which flows to Coldwater Lake and into the North Fork of the Toutle River. Had the lake level not been stabilized, the dam, which was composed of volcanic avalanche debris created by the 1980 eruption, would have been breached and caused catastrophic flooding within the Toutle River Valley.

Gallery

References

External links

 Anonymous, (2006) CVO Photo Archives: Hydrology and Hydrologic Monitoring Images. Cascades Volcano Observatory, United States Geological Survey, Vancouver, Washington.
 Glicken, HX, W Meyer, and MA Sabol, (1989) Geology and ground-water hydrology of Spirit Lake blockage, Mount St. Helens, Washington, with implications for lake retention. Bulletin no. 1789. U.S. Geological Survey, Reston, Virginia.
 Evarts, RC, and RP Ashley (1993a) Geologic map of the Spirit Lake East quadrangle, Skamania County, Washington. scale 1:24,000, Geologic Quadrangle no. 1679, U.S. Geological Survey, Reston, Virginia.
 Evarts, RC, and RP Ashley (1993b) Geologic map of the Spirit Lake West quadrangle, Skamania County, Washington. scale 1:24,000, Geologic Quadrangle no. 1681, U.S. Geological Survey, Reston, Virginia.
 Patton, V (2007) Ecological Mysteries of Spirit Lake Documentary produced by Oregon Field Guide, Oregon Public Broadcasting.

Lakes of Washington (state)
Lakes of Skamania County, Washington
Mount St. Helens
Gifford Pinchot National Forest